Manuel Enrique Mejuto González (born 16 April 1965) is a Spanish former football referee. He is best known for refereeing the 2005 UEFA Champions League Final between Liverpool and Milan. He also officiated two matches in the Euro 2004 in Portugal. In European club competition, he has refereed three UEFA Cup matches and thirty-seven UEFA Champions League matches in his career.

Career
Mejuto was born in La Felguera, Langreo. On 16 October 2005, he referred the Russian Premier League match between Spartak Moscow and Zenit St.Petersburg.

At the Euro 2008 finals, Mejuto dismissed the managers of both teams, Joachim Löw and Josef Hickersberger, from the touchline and into the stands at the end of the first half of the Group B match between Austria and Germany on 16 June 2008, "for what appeared to be an ongoing spat with the fourth official", according to the BBC.

Mejuto refereed in a 2010 World Cup qualification match between Sweden and Denmark on 10 October 2009.

Honours
 Guruceta Trophy: 2001–02, 2002–03, 2003–04
 Silbato de Oro: 1993–94 (Segunda División B), 2003–04 (La Liga)
 Don Balón Award (Best Spanish Referee): 1996–97, 1998–99, 2002–03, 2005–06, 2007–08

References

External links
 
 
 Manuel Enrique Mejuto Gonzalez in the Euro 2008 Finals

1965 births
Living people
People from Langreo
Spanish football referees
UEFA Champions League referees
UEFA Euro 2004 referees
UEFA Euro 2008 referees